Lepinia is a genus of plant in the family Apocynaceae first described as a genus in 1849. It is native to various islands in the Pacific Ocean.

Species
 Lepinia marquisensis Lorence & W.L.Wagner - Fatu Hiva in the Marquesas 
 Lepinia ponapensis Hosok. - Pohnpei in the Caroline Islands
 Lepinia solomonensis Hemsl. - New Guinea, Solomon Islands
 Lepinia taitensis Decne. - Moorea + Tahiti in the Society Islands

References

 
Flora of the Pacific
Taxonomy articles created by Polbot
Apocynaceae genera
Taxa named by Joseph Decaisne